Guyim (also Romanized as Gūyīm; also known as Gūyem-e Pā’īn and Gūyem-e Soflá) is a village in Jowzar Rural District, in the Central District of Mamasani County, Fars Province, Iran. At the 2006 census, its population was 204, in 46 families.

References 

Populated places in Mamasani County